A list of animated feature films released prior to 1940.

Key: 

1910
1910s in animation
1920s in animation
1930s in animation
Lists of 1910s films by genre
Lists of 1920s films by genre
Lists of 1930s films by genre